Sandra Sully is a former member of the all-female band from the 1970s, The Love Machine. She is a songwriter.

The Love Machine era 
In the very diverse landscape of music genres of the 1970s, The Love Machine was an all-female band that "specialized" mainly in funk music. The members of the band were Bernice Givens, Kathy Bradley, Mary Hopkins, Paulette Gibson, Renee Gentry, Sandra Sully and Sheila Dean.  "The Love Machine" performed in Europe, Asia, and Africa for many years recording with and releasing albums under many labels, such as  Arista, Buddah, le trois Musketeers, Phillips, Barclay, and Motowon

Songwriter 
Sandra Sully co-wrote Bobby Womack's "If You Think You're Lonely Now". In 2006 she was credited as a co-writer of Mariah Carey's Grammy Award–winning song "We Belong Together" which incorporated part of "If You're Think You're Lonely Now".  Sandra received a Grammy certificate for "We Belong Together" and the BMI "Song of the Decade" award. The album "The Emancipation of MiMi" sold over ten million copies worldwide. 

Sully also co-wrote "Angel" ,"Sometimes", and "Will You Be Mine?" for Anita Baker, as well as "Just Ain't Good Enough" for Johnnie Taylor. She was previously a member of The Love Machine, a 1970s international all-female singing and dancing group. Sandra co-wrote songs for the soundtrack of the movie Getting Over featuring The Love Machine.  

Sandra has received gold records  for The Best of Anita Baker and The Making of a Man by Jaheim, and "Love in the Future" by John Legend. "Style Council" the self entitled album by the British Rock Group with Paul Weller also earned a gold record. The soundtrack for Jason's Lyric which included "If You Think You're Lonely Now" earned a platinum record. 

Sandra Sully has also written three novels, What Price the Carrot? from I Universe Press and The Entertainer and Perhaps My Sister is Free on Friday from Outskirts Press. 

Sandra Sully is a member of the Broadcast Music Inc, The Society of Composers & Lyricists, Harry Fox Agency, (SONA) Songwriters of North America, National Music Publishers Association and a voting member of the Recording Academy.

Sandra Sully studied Television Production at Los Angeles City College, Los Angeles, California.

References

External links
 
 The Love Machine - I've Got The Music In Me - 1975 Tour in Italy

Funk musicians
Living people
Musicians from Richmond, Virginia
Howard University alumni
Songwriters from Virginia
Year of birth missing (living people)